MPH or mph is a common abbreviation of miles per hour, a measurement of speed.

MPH may also refer to:

 Make Poverty History, campaign to end poverty in Africa
 Manlius Pebble Hill School, DeWitt, New York, US
 Martinair's airline code
 Master of Public Health, degree
 Mater Private Hospital, Dublin, Ireland
 Mobile Pedestrian Handheld a mobile digital television transmission standard
 MPH Group, Malaysian bookstore chain
 MPH Entertainment, Inc., an American film and television production company
 Metroid Prime Hunters, a video game
 MPH, superspeed superhero character in the comic book series Astro City
 Godofredo P. Ramos Airport (IATA code), an airport in the Philippines
 MPH Games Co., a defunct board game publisher

See also 
 MPHS (disambiguation)
 Methylphenidate, a stimulant pharmaceutical usually abbreviated "MPD"